The 2005 Lafayette Leopards football team represented Lafayette College in the 2005 NCAA Division I-AA football season. The team was led by Frank Tavani, in his sixth season as head coach. 

The Leopards played their home games at Fisher Field in Easton, Pennsylvania. All games were televised on the Lafayette Sports Network (LSN).

Schedule

References

Lafayette
Lafayette Leopards football seasons
Patriot League football champion seasons
Lafayette Leopards football